Geranium dalmaticum, commonly called Dalmatian cranesbill, is a species of hardy flowering herbaceous perennial plant in the genus Geranium of the family Geraniaceae. It is native to Dalmatia on the west coast of Croatia. The palmately lobed glossy green leaves are tinted red in the Autumn. It has gained the Royal Horticultural Society's Award of Garden Merit.

References

dalmaticum
Flora of Croatia